Emmanuel David Mas Sgros (born 15 January 1989 in San Juan) is an Argentine footballer who plays as a left-back for Estudiantes de La Plata of the Argentine Primera División. He has been capped internationally eight times for Argentina.

Mas began his career at San Martín de San Juan before moving to San Lorenzo where he won the Argentine Primera División 2013 Inicial and 2014 Copa Libertadores. In 2017, he joined Turkish club Trabzonspor, before returning to Argentina with Boca Juniors where he won another two Primera División titles. In 2021 he played for Orlando City in Major League Soccer.

Club career

San Martín de San Juan
Born in San Juan, Argentina, Mas came through the San Martín de San Juan youth academy. He made his senior debut as a 19 year old on 21 June 2008, starting in the final game of the 2007–08 season as an already-relegated San Martín lost 1–0 to Newell's Old Boys.

While in the Primera Nacional, Mas found his game time limited to nine appearances in 2008–09 and then four the following season as San Martín failed to challenge for promotion during the first two seasons. He established himself as a starter in the 2010–11 season, playing 20 games during the regular season and scored his first goal for the club on 6 March 2011, a 90+2 minute equaliser against CAI Rivadavia. Mas played in both promotion playoff legs against Gimnasia de La Plata as San Martín won promotion 2–1 on aggregate.

He played every minute during the 2011 Apertura and scored his first top-flight goal on 26 August 2011 in a 2–2 draw with Estudiantes de La Plata. At the end of the season he played in both legs of the relegation playoff as San Martín saved themselves from relegation, drawing 0–0 with Rosario Central. The following season he played in 37 of the 38 league games, his most in San Martín, with his performances leading to transfer interest.

San Lorenzo
In July 2013, Mas signed for San Lorenzo. His scored his first goal on 17 November 2013 in a 4–2 win over Belgrano as San Lorenzo clinched the 2013 Inicial title. Mas was an undisputed starter during San Lorenzo's run to the 2014 Copa Libertadores finals, starting all 14 games as the team beat Paraguay's Nacional over two-legs in the final to win the first Copa Libertadores title in club history. The victory qualified San Lorenzo for the 2014 FIFA Club World Cup, held in Morocco in December 2014. They beat 2013–14 OFC Champions League winners Auckland City FC in extra-time in the semi-final before losing to Spanish giants Real Madrid in the final. Mas played every minute in both games. Between 19 May 2014 and 9 May 2015, Mas played every minute of every game without being substituted, a run of 52 matches. While with San Lorenzo, Mas' performances earned him his first call-up to the Argentina national team in August 2015.

Trabzonspor
On 4 January 2017, Turkish Süper Lig club Trabzonspor announced the signing of Mas for €1.5 million on a three-and-a-half year contract until June 2020.

Boca Juniors
On 4 January 2018, Mas returned to the Argentine Primera División following a €2.3 million transfer to Boca Juniors. His Trabzonspor manager Rıza Çalımbay was quoted as saying he "did not want to sell Mas" but the player was homesick and wanted to return home to improve his chances of making Argentina's 2018 World Cup squad that summer. In three-and-a-half years, Mas played 82 games for Boca Juniors, winning the league title in 2017–18 and 2019–20, as well as the 2020 Copa de la Liga Profesional. He left Boca upon the expiry of his contract on 30 June 2021.

Orlando City
Having originally been in negotiations and close to a deal with Independiente, Mas eventually moved to the United States on 14 July 2021 to sign a sixth-month contract with MLS side Orlando City until the end of the 2021 season with an additional club option year. Mas had his contract option declined at the end of the 2021 season having made 18 appearances in all competitions.

Estudiantes
On 6 January 2022, Mas returned to the Argentine Primera División and signed with Estudiantes LP.

International career
Mas earned his first call-up to the Argentina national team in August 2015 by Tata Martino as an injury replacement for Pablo Zabaleta. He made his international debut on 4 September 2015, starting in a 7–0 friendly win over Bolivia at BBVA Stadium, Houston. He also appeared as a substitute in the following game, a 2–2 draw with Mexico. A month later, Mas was recalled to the squad during the next window and started both matches as Argentina began 2018 FIFA World Cup qualification with a 2–0 defeat to Ecuador and a goalless draw with Paraguay. He was an unused substitute during the next set of qualifiers in November 2015 before being left out of the squad in March 2016. He was not named to the squad for the 2016 Copa América but was recalled in September, starting in a World Cup qualifying win over Uruguay. He played in a further three matches, all as the starting left back, before being left out for the final four games as Argentina narrowly rescued qualifying in the last automatic spot. Despite Martino defending Mas' repeated selection as a chance to look at players in contention to be taken to the World Cup, he was eventually left out of the squad and has not received a call-up since.

Career statistics

Club

International

Honours
San Lorenzo
Argentine Primera División: 2013 Inicial
Copa Libertadores: 2014
FIFA Club World Cup runner-up: 2014
Supercopa Argentina: 2015

Boca Juniors
Primera División: 2017–18, 2019–20
Copa Argentina: 2019–20
Copa de la Liga Profesional: 2020
Supercopa Argentina: 2018

References

External links
 

1989 births
Living people
Argentine footballers
Argentine expatriate footballers
Argentina international footballers
Association football fullbacks
San Martín de San Juan footballers
San Lorenzo de Almagro footballers
Trabzonspor footballers
Boca Juniors footballers
Orlando City SC players
Estudiantes de La Plata footballers
Argentine Primera División players
Primera Nacional players
Süper Lig players
Major League Soccer players
Expatriate footballers in Turkey
Argentine expatriate sportspeople in Turkey
People from San Juan, Argentina
Sportspeople from San Juan Province, Argentina
Argentine expatriate sportspeople in the United States
Expatriate soccer players in the United States